Daniil Medvedev defeated Alexander Zverev in the final, 6–4, 6–1 to win the singles tennis title at the 2019 Shanghai Masters. He did not drop a set en route to the title.

Novak Djokovic was the defending champion, but lost to Stefanos Tsitsipas in the quarterfinals.

This was the first time since the 1999 ATP German Open that all four semifinalists at a Masters event were under the age of 24.

Seeds
The top eight seeds receive a bye into the second round.

Draw

Finals

Top half

Section 1

Section 2

Bottom half

Section 3

Section 4

Qualifying

Seeds

Qualifiers

Qualifying draw

First qualifier

Second qualifier

Third qualifier

Fourth qualifier

Fifth qualifier

Sixth qualifier

Seventh qualifier

References

External links
 Main Draw
 Qualifying Draw

Singles